The Williams Club is in residence at the Penn Club of New York for alumni of Williams College. Until 2010, it had its own private clubhouse at 39th Street, which today operates as an unaffiliated boutique hotel.

The Williams Club was founded in 1913 by Williams alumni in New York City as a place to socialize. The club was originally located at 291 Madison Avenue in a building donated by Mary Clark Thompson, wife of Williams alumnus Frederick Ferris Thompson. In 1921, it moved to 24 East 39th Street in Manhattan, which it then renovated in 1988. On June 1, 2010, however, the Williams Club ceased operating on its own and moved its membership program and related activities to the Princeton Club. After the permanent closure of the Princeton Club in fall 2021, the Williams Club moved to the Penn Club in March 2022. Today, members and their guests can use the Penn Club's facilities.

Membership
Although the club is primarily made up of Williams alumni, membership categories also include Affiliate Membership and Associate Membership.  Affiliate Membership is available to graduates, faculty members or senior administrators of 35 institutions, many of which are small liberal arts colleges such as Williams itself.  Associate Membership is available to individuals with a BA from an accredited school and the sponsorship of a current member.
Alumni of the following institutions are eligible for affiliate membership: 
 Amherst College
 Bates College
 Baruch College
 Bennington College
 Boston College
 Bowdoin College
 Colby College
 Colgate University
 Connecticut College
 Dickinson College
 Drew University
 Georgetown University
 Goucher College
 Hamilton College
 Hobart and William Smith Colleges
 Marymount Manhattan College
 Middlebury College
 Massachusetts Institute of Technology
 Mount Holyoke College
 Rutgers University
 Skidmore College
 Smith College
 St. John's University
 St. Lawrence University
 Thunderbird School of Global Management
 Trinity College
 Tufts University
 Union College
 University of Cincinnati
 University of North Carolina
 University of Maryland
 Vassar College
 Wellesley College
 Wesleyan University
 Wheaton College

See also
Columbia University Club of New York
List of American gentlemen's clubs
Harvard Club of New York
Cornell Club of New York
Penn Club of New York City
Princeton Club of New York
Yale Club of New York City

References

External links 
The Williams Club

1913 establishments in New York (state)
Defunct organizations based in New York City
Gentlemen's clubs in New York City
Williams College